Perry River (Kuugjuaq) is a waterway in the Kitikmeot Region, Nunavut, Canada. It empties into Chester Bay on the southern Queen Maud Gulf.

At one time, Stephen Angulalik, and later Red Pedersen, ran a Hudson's Bay Company outpost called Perry River on a small island at the mouth of the river.

See also
List of rivers of Nunavut

References

Rivers of Kitikmeot Region
Hudson's Bay Company trading posts in Nunavut
Former populated places in the Kitikmeot Region